Birmingham Stechford was a parliamentary constituency centred on the Stechford district of the city of Birmingham.  It returned one Member of Parliament (MP) to the House of Commons of the Parliament of the United Kingdom, elected by the first-past-the-post voting system.

The constituency was created for the 1950 general election, and abolished for the 1983 general election. Stechford itself is now part of the Birmingham Yardley seat.

Boundaries 
1950–1955: The County Borough of Birmingham wards of Sheldon, Stechford, and Washwood Heath.

1955–1974: The County Borough of Birmingham wards of Stechford and Washwood Heath.

1974–1983: The County Borough of Birmingham wards of Shard End, Stechford, and Washwood Heath.

Members of Parliament

Election results

Elections in the 1950s

Elections in the 1960s

Elections in the 1970s

References 

Parliamentary constituencies in Birmingham, West Midlands (historic)
Constituencies of the Parliament of the United Kingdom established in 1950
Constituencies of the Parliament of the United Kingdom disestablished in 1983